Joseph Irenée Rochefort (July 9, 1910 – April 4, 1979) was a Canadian politician and a Member of the House of Commons.

Background

He was born on July 9, 1910 in Cap-de-la-Madeleine, Mauricie.  He was a musician and a real estate agent.

Political career

Rochefort ran as a Liberal candidate in the federal district of Champlain in 1949 and won.  He was re-elected in 1953 and 1957.

He did not run for re-election in 1958 and was succeeded by Paul Lahaye of the Progressive Conservative Party.

Honors

Rue Rochefort (Rochefort Street) in Cap-de-la-Madeleine was named to honor him.

References 

1910 births
1979 deaths
Liberal Party of Canada MPs
Members of the House of Commons of Canada from Quebec